David John Briggs (born 1 November 1962) is an English organist and composer. He started his career as a cathedral organist as Assistant Organist at Hereford Cathedral before becoming the organist of Truro and Gloucester Cathedrals. Heavily influenced by Jean Langlais and Pierre Cochereau, Briggs is regarded as one of the world's finest improvisors, and now works as a concert organist. He is also a composer of choral and organ music, and has transcribed many orchestral works for solo organ, as well as many of Cochereau's recorded improvisations.

Early life and training

Briggs was born in Bromsgrove, Worcestershire, to a musical family. His grandfather, Lawrence Briggs, had been organist at St Jude's Church, Birmingham, for over 40 years, and his parents met while playing in the Birmingham Hospitals Orchestra.

He was a chorister at St Philip's Cathedral, Birmingham, from 1970 to 1973, where he began to develop his interest in the organ. In 1973 he won a BBC Television piano competition and was awarded a music scholarship to Solihull School, where he studied piano, organ, violin and viola. He played the viola in the National Youth Orchestra from 1977 to 1981, becoming Principal Viola in his final year. From 1979 to 1981 he also served as organist at the church of St Alban the Martyr, Birmingham.

At the relatively early age of 17 he was awarded a Fellowship of the Royal College of Organists (FRCO), and from 1981 to 1984 was an organ scholar at King's College, Cambridge. In 1982 and 1983 he played during the well-known Festival of Nine Lessons and Carols, heard by millions around the world He also toured Australia, New Zealand, Belgium, the Netherlands and Germany with the college choir.

In 1983 he received the Countess of Munster Award to study interpretation and improvisation with Jean Langlais in Paris, with whom he furthered in his interest in the art of improvisation by his transcriptions of the recordings of Pierre Cochereau. Transcribing the remarkable improvisations from Cochereau's cassette recordings took eleven years, and Briggs's subsequent performances and recordings of them earned him his initial acclaim.

In 1993 Briggs became the first British organist to win the Tournemire prize for improvisation at the St Albans International Organ Festival.

Cathedral organist

On leaving university, Briggs was appointed as Assistant Organist at Hereford Cathedral, where he also took over the directorship of Hereford Chamber Choir and Hereford String Orchestra.

He was appointed Organist and Master of the Choristers of Truro Cathedral in 1989, before moving to the similar post at Gloucester Cathedral in 1994. While at Gloucester he oversaw the rebuilding of the organ which included the installation of the "divided pedal". This allows the pedal board to be "split", meaning that the pedal stops sound on the lower section,and  the upper section can be set to reproduce the sound of any of the manuals. Briggs also oversaw the installation of this system on the Father Willis organ of Truro Cathedral in its rebuild in 1991. During his time at Gloucester, he conducted the Three Choirs Festival.

Upon leaving Gloucester in 2002 to pursue a freelance career as a concert organist and composer, Briggs was made Organist Emeritus at Gloucester Cathedral and was succeeded for a second time by Andrew Nethsingha.

Concert organist and composer
Considered one of the finest concert organists and improvisors of his generation, Briggs currently teaches and performs around the world. He gives regular masterclasses at the Royal Northern College of Music and Cambridge University, among others. He is also the composer of over 60 works, mostly for choir and organ.

He made his debut at the BBC Proms on 14 August 2010 as part of Bach Day, playing pieces by Johann Sebastian Bach, some originally for organ, others in arrangements, including Briggs's own arrangement of the Orchestral Suite No. 3 in D major, BWV 1068.

From 2012 to 2017, Briggs was Artist-in-Residence at the Cathedral Church of St. James in Toronto, Canada. His responsibilities included giving celebrity recitals, playing regularly at services, composing liturgical music for the Cathedral and working on the establishment of a vision for the music programme, including the design and installation of a new organ or organs and relevant acoustical enhancements.

In October 2017, he became Artist-in-Residence at the Cathedral of St. John the Divine in New York City.

Family
Briggs has lived in the United States since 2003 and has been married twice. He married his second wife, Margaret Nimocks, in 2004, adopting a daughter, Eloise, and has two daughters from his previous marriage.

Compositions

Choir and organ
 Truro Eucharist (1990), SATB and organ
 The Music Mountain (1991), SATB, Soprano and Tenor soloists and 2 organs.
 The Noble Stem of Jesse (1996), SSAATTBB, for Gloucester Cathedral choir
 When Waters Kiss One Bank (1996), SSAATTBB, for Gloucester Cathedral choir, words by John Donne
 Holy is the True Light (1997), ATB and organ, Commissioned by RSCM America
 Jubilate Deo (1998), SATB Soprano solo and organ
 O Thou Who Art Unchangeable (1999), SATB, two Soprano soloists and organ. Commissioned by Virginia Wesleyian University, USA
 Matin Responsary (1999), SSAATTBB for the Gloucester Cathedral Choir
 Magnificat and Nunc Dimittis (2000), SATB, Tenor solo and organ, Commissioned by the Hereford Three Choirs Festival 2000
 Messe pour Notre-Dame (2002), SATB and 2 Organs, commissioned by the Choir of Keynsham Parish Church, Bristol.
 The Rising (2003), SATB and Organ (based on an Old Celtic Prayer), commissioned by the Choir of Church Street United Methodist Church, Knoxville, Tennessee
 Hosanna to the Son of David (2003), SATB and Organ commissioned by the Choir of Kirk-in-the-Hills, Bloomfield Hills, MI
 When in our music God is glorified (2003), trebles and Organ (with optional Trumpet), commissioned by the Bristol Cathedral Girls Choir for their 10th anniversary
 Ave Verum Corpus (2004), SATB, commissioned by the choir of St Mary's Cathedral, Edinburgh
 Regina Coeli (2004), SATB, commissioned by St. Mary's Church, Moseley for their 600th Anniversary Year
 Christ's Peace, Commissioned by the Rosengren family in celebration of 35 years of marriage
 Music, SATB A setting of the poem by Walter de la Mare. Commissioned by the Britten Singers, Hereford
 Ave Maria, TTBB and organ, commissioned by the Lay Clerks of Blackburn Cathedral
 Magnificat and Nunc Dimittis 'The Truro Service' (2004), commissioned in thanksgiving for the life of John Taylour
 Caedmon's Hymn, SSAATTBB for Carlisle Cathedral Festival
 Magnificat and Nunc Dimittis for Jesus College, Cambridge (2008)
 Magnificat and Nunc Dimittis for St Davids Cathedral (2008)
 Messe pour Saint-Sulpice (2010), SATB and Organ, commissioned by the Choir of All Saints, Northampton, UK.

Choir and orchestra
 Te Deum Laudamus (1997), SATB chorus, Soprano and Tenor soloists, Full Orchestra. Three Choirs Festival Commission
 Creation (2000) SATB chorus, Soprano solo, Full Orchestra
 Te Deum Laudamus (2003), TB Choir, 2 organs, flute, oboe, 2 horns, 2 trumpets, harp and strings. Commissioned for the 150th Anniversary of St Benedict's Abbey, Subiaco, Arkansas
 Atlanta Requiem (2003), SATB, Soprano, Tenor and Bass soloists, Flute, Oboe, Trumpet, Harp, Glockenspiel, Timpani
 St John Passion (2005), SATB, Soprano, Alto, Tenor and Bass Soloists, Evangelist (tenor), Jesus (bass), organ and orchestra.  Commissioned by Kirk-in-the-Hills, Bloomfield Hills, Michigan.

Organ
 Marche Episcopale (1999), commissioned by the Incorporated Association of Organists
 Transcription of the Improvised Fugue/Toccata on 'I Vow To Thee My Country' (2000)- improvisation by Briggs at the re-opening recital of Gloucester Cathedral organ. Commissioned by Mark Batten, Organist of the Birmingham Oratory.
 Variations on 'Veni Creator', (for Organ Duet), commissioned by Elizabeth and Raymond Chenault
 THEME AND VARIATIONS, for the Worshipful Company of Actuaries. Commissioned by Catherine Ennis, Organist at St Lawrence-Jewry, London)
 Organ Symphony on Themes from the 'Missa pro defunctiis' for Stephen Farr, Organist of Guildford Cathedral, premiered by him at St David's Cathedral on 3 June 2004
 Organ Concerto for Blackburn Cathedral. Organ, strings, harp, timpani, side drum, and glockenspiel.
 Elegy, commissioned in celebration of the 80th Birthday of Patrick Bell, Esq, Cookham Dean.
 3 Improvisations a re-construction of improvisations by American cinema organist Buddy Cole.
 Variations on 'Laudi Spirituali' (2004)
 Variations on Greensleeves (2005)
 Trio Sonata (2005)
 Fantasie (2005)
 Four Concert Etudes (2005)
 Berceuse (2006)
 Mosaique: Sonata for Organ Duet (2008)
 Sortie on In Dulci Jubilo(2008)
 Toccata for St Matthew's Day(2008)
 Hommage a Marcel Dupré (2009)
 Le Tombeau de Duruflé (2009)
 The Legend of St Nikolaus(2009)
 Chorale Variations: Lobe den Herren (2010)
 Fantasia on Mendelssohn(2010)

Organ transcriptions
 Symphony No. 2 – Gustav Mahler
 Symphony No. 3 – Gustav Mahler
 Symphony No. 5 – Gustav Mahler
 Symphony No. 6 – Gustav Mahler
 Symphony No. 8 – Gustav Mahler
 Symphony No. 1 – Edward Elgar
 Symphony No. 2 – Edward Elgar
 Symphony No. 8 – Franz Schubert
 Symphony No. 4 – Peter Ilyich Tchaikovsky
 Sigurd Jorsalfar – Edvard Grieg
 Daphnis et Chloe  – Orchestral Suite No. 2 Maurice Ravel
 Symphony No. 3: Final – Camille Saint-Saëns
 Tone Poem "Death and Transfiguration" – Richard Strauss
 Pierre Cochereau transcriptions:
 Berceuse à la mémoire de Louis Vierne
 Suite de Danses Improvisees
 Triptique Symphonique
 Cantem toto la Gloria
 Variations sur 'Venez Divin Messie'
 Improvisations sur 'Alouette, gentille Alouette'
 Two Improvisations on 'La Marseillaise
 Scherzo Symphonique
 Air ('Trimazo') from Suite Française
 Gigue ('Compagnons de la Marjolaine')
 Bolero sur un theme de Charles Racquet
 Entree (Les offices du Dimanche)
 Mission Universelle (Improvisations on St Matthew's Gospel)

Other
 Fanfare for Wells (2002), for Organ, 3 Trumpets, 3 Trombones and Cymbals.  A 2-minute Fanfare (à la Marcel Dupré!') intended for use immediately before I was glad by C. Hubert H. Parry, commissioned by the Wells Cathedral Voluntary Choir, September 2002
 Chempinesca (2004), for Piano Duet, in celebration of Beryl Chempin's distinguished teaching career at the Birmingham Conservatoire.
 Dreamworld: Song Cycle (2005)

Discography
 Improvisations III (n.d.) Gloucester Cathedral, Briggs Label
 Music to rouse the spirit (n.d.) Gloucester Cathedral, Briggs label DBCD5
 Bach at Gloucester (n.d.), Gloucester Cathedral, Briggs label DBCD4
 Great European Organs No. 16 (1990), St George's Hall, Liverpool, Priory Records PRCD284
 O Come all ye faithful (1990) King's College Choir, Cambridge, Decca
 Choral Evensong from Truro Cathedral (Briggs/Henry Doughty) (1993), Truro Cathedral, Priory Records PRCD322
 The Illusionist's Art – Cochereau Transcriptions (1994), Truro Cathedral, Priory Records PRCD428
 Great Organ Transcriptions (1995), Truro Cathedral, Kevin Mayhew CD KMCD1007
 Vivaldi: Gloria (1995), St John's College Choir, Cambridge, King's College Choir, Cambridge, Decca
 Popular Organ Music Volume 2 (1996) Gloucester Cathedral, Priory Records PRCD568
 Guilmant Organ Works: Volume 4 (1997), Truro Cathedral Motette 11541
 Mahler: Symphony No. 5 (1998), Gloucester Cathedral, Priory Records PRCD649
 King of Kings – improvisation to silent movie by Cecil B. de Mille (1999) Gloucester Cathedral, Briggs label
 Organ Spectacular (1999), First Congregational Church, Los Angeles, California. Delos 3241
 Silent Night (1999) King's College Choir, Cambridge, Decca
 Improvisations II (2000) Gloucester Cathedral and The Oratory of St Philip Neri, Birmingham, Briggs Label
 Re-Opening of Gloucester Cathedral Organ (2000), Gloucester Cathedral, Briggs label
 Organ Kaleidoscope (2000), Gloucester Cathedral, Priory Records PRCD685
 Great European Organs No. 57 (2000), St John the Evangelist, Upper Norwood, London, Priory Records PRCD680.
 Two of a Kind (with Wayne Marshall) (2001), Gloucester Cathedral Herald AV Publications HAVPCD246
 Christmas Adagios (2001), various, Decca double disc
 The No. 1 Christmas Album (2001), various, Decca
 The World of Organ Transcription (2002), Gloucester Cathedral, Priory Records PRCD79
 Sounds Artistic (2002), Blackburn Cathedral, Lammas LAMM153
 Rossini: Petite Messa Solonelle (Harmonium) (2002), with Stephen Cleobury, King's College Choir, Cambridge. EMI Records.
 Simply Christmas (2003), various, Decca
 Fanfare I (2003), various, Gloucester Cathedral, Priory Records, PRCD5000
 Fanfare II (2004), various, St John's Upper Norwood, London, Priory Records PRCD5001
 Sounds French (2004), Blackburn Cathedral, Lammas LAMM164D
 Rossini: Stabat Mater (Harmonium) (2005), with Stephen Cleobury, King's College Choir, Cambridge. EMI Records.
 Handel: Coronation Anthems (2005), with Sir Philip Ledger, King's College Choir, Cambridge. EMI Records.
 David Briggs Live! (2006), Trinity Episcopal Church, Little Rock, Arkansas, Pro Organo PO7176
 Dreamworld (Briggs' Compositions) (2006)
 Requiem and Organ Concerto (2006), Blackburn Cathedral, Chestnut 002
 Messe pour Notre-Dame (2010), Gloucester Cathedral, with Stephen Layton, Trinity College Choir, Cambridge Hyperion Records 67808
 Bursts of Acclamation: Ralph Vaughan Williams – Organ music and transcriptions (2016)
 The Glory of Gloucester 'Live' in concert on the organ of Gloucester Cathedral
 Symphony No 8 – Gustav Mahler
 Symphony No 2, 'The Resurrection' – Gustav Mahler

References

External links

1962 births
English classical composers
20th-century classical composers
English classical organists
British male organists
Organ improvisers
Cathedral organists
Living people
Alumni of King's College, Cambridge
People educated at Solihull School
Fellows of the Royal College of Organists
English male classical composers
20th-century English composers
21st-century organists
20th-century British male musicians
21st-century British male musicians
Male classical organists